De panzazo (stylized as 'De P6nz6zo; , but figuratively "barely approved") is a Mexican documentary film, led by Juan Carlos Rulfo and co-produced by Carlos Loret de Mola. It was an initiative of the Mexican non-profit educational organization "Mexicanos Primero" (Mexicans First). This project was developed over three years. It premiered in Mexico on February 24, 2012, in Guadalajara, San Luis Potosi, Mérida, Morelia, Puebla, Querétaro and the  Federal District.

Synopsis
The movie reflects the current state of education in Mexico. The movie shows parents, principals, teachers, officials, union representatives and opinion leaders to present an overall picture about education in Mexico.

It captures the daily dynamics of schools in Ciudad Juarez within Yucatan, Morelia, the mountains of Chiapas and Guerrero and Naucalpan and Iztapalapa in the metropolitan area of Mexico City.

Controversies
The film was criticized for ignoring Elba Esther Gordillo's relationship with Felipe Calderon and Emilio Azcarraga Jean and the Alliance for Quality Education in 2008.

References

External links
 Official website

2012 films